Upwood Meadows is a 6 hectare biological Site of Special Scientific Interest west of Upwood in Cambridgeshire. It is also a National Nature Reserve and a Grade I Nature Conservation Review site. It is managed by the Wildlife Trust for Bedfordshire, Cambridgeshire and Northamptonshire.

The site has three fields on calcareous clay with poor drainage, a type of pasture now very rare, and was described by Derek Ratcliffe as having "an outstandingly rich and diverse flora". Other habitats are mature hedgerows, ponds and scrub. One of the fields is agriculturally unimproved, and the evidence of medieval ridge and furrow still survives. Flowering plants include pepper saxifrage and green-winged orchid.

There is access by a footpath from Bentley Close in Upwood.

See also

Great Fen
Woodwalton Fen

References

Wildlife Trust for Bedfordshire, Cambridgeshire and Northamptonshire reserves
Sites of Special Scientific Interest in Cambridgeshire
National nature reserves in England
Nature Conservation Review sites